Teragram Corporation is a fully owned subsidiary of SAS Institute, headquartered in Cary, North Carolina, USA.  Teragram is based in Cambridge, Massachusetts and specializes in the application of computational linguistics to multilingual natural language processing.

Teragram's technology is licensed to public search engines such as Ask.com and Yahoo!, to media companies including the New York Times and the Tribune Company, and to original equipment manufacturer (OEM) customers such as Fast Search & Transfer and Verity.

Teragram was founded by Emmanuel Roche and Yves Schabes in 1997 and acquired by SAS Institute in 2008.

Its major competitor is Inxight.

Notes

External links
Teragram web site

Natural language processing
Knowledge management
Companies based in Cambridge, Massachusetts
Software companies based in North Carolina
Privately held companies based in North Carolina
Defunct software companies of the United States